The Voice of My City is a 1953 Argentine musical comedy film directed by Tulio Demicheli and starring Mariano Mores and
Diana Maggi.

Plot
Roberto Moran (Mariano Mores) has just arrived in Buenos Aires from the provinces to work in a foundry. He can play the bandoneón by ear but wants to have proper training in music at a conservatory run by a frustrated old musician, Don Matias (Ricardo Galache). The old man first rejects both Roberto and his instrument, but after hearing him play, he changes his mind and takes him on, though forbidding him to play popular music, which he despises.

Roberto becomes a great classical pianist, but as he acquires proficiency, he secretly composes tangos too. One of the best sequences shows him informally playing the Argentine "Taquito Militar" accompanied by the other students playing their classical instruments (violin, clarinet, harp).

Roberto wins a scholarship to go to Europe to further his success as a pianist but he turns it down, preferring to compose "music that reveals the soul of the city". "The day will come," he tells the conductor Aquiles Baldi (Orestes Soriani), "when your great orchestra will play this kind of music."

A conflict arises with the arrival of factory owner, Francisco Romani (Santiago Gómez Cou), a calculating authoritarian who admires the United States. Roberto and Romani are both interested in Isabel (Diana Maggi), the conservatory director's daughter, who is torn between staying with the infatuated young musician who loves her or opting for the affluence of his more mature opponent. At the end of the film the roles are reversed: while Roberto achieves both popular success and the support of the "cult", showing his old master he can indeed express the "voice of the city", the entrepreneur is finally revealed to be a worthy suitor, full of feeling, who can succeed in winning the heart of the young woman.

Cast
 Mariano Mores, as Roberto Morán
 Diana Maggi, as Isabel, daughter of the director of the Conservatory
 Santiago Gómez Cou as Francisco Romani
 Ricardo Galache as Don Matías, director of the Conservatory
 Virginia de la Cruz as Dorita, girlfriend of Jorge
 Enrique Lucero as Jorge, brother of Roberto
 Orestes Soriani as Maestro Aquiles Baldi
 Susana Vargas
 Alberto Dalbes as band leader
 Domingo Mania as secretary of Don Romani
 Jorge Leval
 Tito Grassi
 Mario Fortuna as Martín Baigorria, clarinetist
 Lois Blue
 Rodolfo Salerno as Juan the violinist
 Elena Cruz as Angélica, the harpist
 Aldo Vega as violinist
 Carlos Escobares
 Francisco Canaro 
 Juan D'Arienzo 
 Lois Blue Faure

References

External links
 

1953 films
1950s Spanish-language films
Argentine black-and-white films
Films directed by Tulio Demicheli
1953 musical comedy films
Tango films
1950s romantic musical films
Films shot in Buenos Aires
Films set in Buenos Aires
Films with screenplays by Tulio Demicheli
Argentine musical comedy films